Pepi Manaskov (born 19 August 1964) is a former Macedonian handball player and current coach of Vardar Junior.

His sons Dejan and Martin are handball players.

In November 2011, he became the head coach of RK Kumanovo.

Clubs
RK Pelister (1986-1993)
US Créteil (1991-1993)
VFL Hameln (1993–1997)
RK Pelister (1997–1998)
Celje Pivovarna Lasko (1998–2000)
RK Vardar PRO (2000–2002)
HC Fillipos Verias (2002–2003)
RK Vardar PRO (2003–2004)
RK Pelister (2004–2005)
RK Vardar PRO (2005–2006)

Honours & Achievements
As player:
RK Pelister
Macedonian Handball Championship:
Winner: 1997/98, 2004/05
Macedonian Handball Cup:
Winner: 1997/98, 2004/05
Doboj International Handball Tournament:
Winner: 1996/97
RK Celje Pivovarna Lasko
Slovenian Championships:
Winner: 1997/98, 1998/99, 1999/00
Slovenian Cup:
Winner: 1997/98, 1998/99, 1999/00
RK Vardar PRO
Macedonian Handball Championship:
Winner: 2000/01, 2001/02, 2003/04
Macedonian Handball Cup:
Winner: 2000/01, 2003/04
AC Filippos Verias
Greek Handball League:
Winner: 2002/03
Greek Handball Cup:
Winner: 2002/03

References

External links
Pepi Manaskov
Pepi Manaskov

1964 births
Living people
Sportspeople from Veles, North Macedonia
Macedonian male handball players
Macedonian expatriate sportspeople in Germany
Macedonian expatriate sportspeople in Slovenia
Macedonian expatriate sportspeople in Greece
Expatriate handball players
RK Vardar players
Macedonian expatriate sportspeople in France